Tuzla is a municipality of the province in Istanbul, Turkey on the Asian side of the city next to the municipality of Pendik. Tuzla is on a headland on the coast of Marmara Sea, at the eastern limit of the city. The mayor is Şadi Yazıcı (AKP).

History
The Greek name for the headland was Akritas (Ακρίτας). In the Ottoman period, the inhabitants of this fishing and farming village were mainly Greeks. The local Greek population of Tuzla was exchanged with the Turkish residents of Salonica, Kavala and, Drama during the population exchange between Greece and Turkey following the Treaty of Lausanne and the foundation of the Turkish Republic in 1923.

Tuzla today
Today there are still fishing boats, but by the end of the 1980s, fishing had been overtaken by industry, particularly shipbuilding; the shipyards of Tuzla remain active. There is still some farming going on inland from the town of Tuzla, although there is also industrial development.

Tuzla is a small town famous for its seafront and its many fish restaurants. It is also a popular location for wealthy or retired Istanbul residents to buy homes as it is far from the city, less crowded and still retains a 'small-town feel' to it. Travelling to Kadıköy from Tuzla by public transport takes about an hour to 40 minutes by train or bus. The European side transit hubs of Eminönü and Beşiktaş are another 30 minutes away by ferry.

There is a wetland inland from the coast, important for birdlife, but it has deteriorated badly as the town of Tuzla has grown, and some factories are dumping their waste into the lagoon. Today, the biggest problems in Tuzla are air pollution and ecology in general.

Recently, Tuzla has become known for frequent deaths of shipyard workers. The government is being criticised for not controlling illegal employment and not forcing companies to maintain better working conditions. Companies claim they contribute great amounts to the Turkish economy and low-paid workers are their advantage. In February and March 2008, thousands of workers went on strike for better wages and conditions. The police intervened in the demonstrations, and 86 workers were taken into police custody, 15 of them injured.

Climate 
Tuzla experiences a warm-summer Mediterranean climate (Csb/Cs) according to both Köppen and Trewartha climate classifications, with cool winters and warm summers. Located far away from the city's urban heat island, its nights are colder than districts inside the city; Tuzla's climate is often thought to be southern Istanbul's pre-urbanized climate. It is in USDA hardiness zone 8b with pockets of 8a, and in AHS heat zone 4.

Places of importance
ITU School of Maritime
Koç School
Okan University
Piri Reis University
Sabancı University
School of Infantry (Piyade Okulu)
Turkish Naval Academy
Istanbul Park Racing Circuit

Politics
The mayor of Tuzla throughout the 1990s was İdris Güllüce, a leading figure in the conservative Justice and Development Party (AK Party).

References

External links

 Sabancı University
 Local Newspaper: Tuzla Gazetesi (Tuzla Haberleri) www.tuzlagazetesi.com.tr
 "Shipbuilding 'Success' Based on Human Sacrifice" by Bianet
 "Yet More Deaths at Tuzla Shipyards!" by Bianet
 Local real estate agent: Tuzla Emlakçı (Tuzla gayrimenkul danışmanlık ofisi) www.www.tuzlasatilikdaire.com

 
Populated places in Istanbul Province
Fishing communities in Turkey
Districts of Istanbul Province